Colocasia flavicornis (yellowhorn) is a moth of the family Noctuidae. It is found in North America, east of the Rocky Mountains. In Canada, it is found in Ontario, Quebec, New Brunswick, Nova Scotia, Saskatchewan and Manitoba.

Adults are on wing from March to September. There are two generations per year.

The larvae feed on a variety of deciduous trees, including beech, oak, maple and elm.

External links
Bug Guide
Images

Pantheinae
Moths of North America
Moths described in 1884